Amonemobius is a genus of cricket in the subfamily Nemobiinae.

Taxonomy
The Orthoptera Species File database lists the following species:
Amonemobius vexans Otte, 1987

References

Trigonidiidae